Haywire may refer to:

 Baling wire, used in an agricultural setting and industrial setting for everything from mending fences to manually binding square bales of hay

Literature, TV, film
 "Haywire" (Australian Playhouse), a 1966 Australian TV play
 Haywire (1980 film), a 1980 American TV movie based on the autobiography by Brooke Hayward
 Haywire (2011 film), a 2011 American action film
 Haywire (TV series), an American television comedy series
 Charles "Haywire" Patoshik, a fictional character from the U.S. television series Prison Break
 Haywire (book), the memoir of Brooke Hayward
 Haywire (comics), a minor Marvel Comics character
 Haywire, a short-lived comic book series from DC Comics
 Haywire, the Nebulan partner of Transformers character Blurr

Music 
 Haywire (band), a Canadian hard rock band
 Haywire (Chris LeDoux album), 1994
 Haywire (Josh Turner album), 2010
 Haywire (mixtape), by Hopsin and SwizZz, 2009

See also
 Haywyre (born 1992), American electronic music producer